Usama Aziz (born 31 August 1972), also known as Sami Aziz, is a Swedish retired wrestler and mixed martial artist. He competed at the 1992 Summer Olympics and the 1996 Summer Olympics. He finished 5th in the 1992 European Championships and another 5th place in the 1995 World Championships, both in the style of Greco-Roman. His mixed martial arts career started in 2005. He competed in organisations such as Bellator MMA and Bodog Fight. He retired in 2013, following a victory over former UFC Lightweight Champion Jens Pulver.

Championships and accomplishments

Amateur wrestling
United World Wrestling - European Championships
1988 Cadets European Championship Freestyle  (-55 kg)
1989 Juniors European Championship Greco-Roman  (-54 kg)
1992 Espoir European Championship Greco-Roman  (-62 kg)

Nordic Wrestling Association
1990 Junior Nordic Championships Greco-Roman  (-57 kg)
1991 Junior Nordic Championships Greco-Roman  (-62 kg)
1992 Junior Nordic Championships Greco-Roman  (-62 kg)
1993 Baltic Sea Games Greco-Roman  (-62 kg)
1994 Nordic Championships Greco-Roman  (-62 kg)
1996 Nordic Championships Greco-Roman  (-62 kg)

Swedish Wrestling Federation
1990 Swedish National Championships Freestyle  (Bantamweight)
1992 Swedish National Championships Greco-Roman  (Featherweight)
2002 Swedish National Championships Greco-Roman  (Lightweight)

Amateur Boxing
Swedish Boxing Federation
1998 Swedish National Championship 
1999 Swedish National Championship 
2000 Swedish National Championship 
2001 Swedish National Championship 
2006 Swedish National Championship

Mixed martial arts record

|-
|Win
|align=center| 6–3–1 (1)
|Jens Pulver
|Decision (unanimous)
|Superior Challenge 9
|
|align=center| 3
|align=center| 5:00
|Gothenburg, Sweden
|
|-
|Loss
|align=center| 5–3–1 (1)
|Joachim Hansen
|Submission (armbar)
|Superior Challenge 6
|
|align=center| 2
|align=center| 3:47
|Stockholm, Sweden
| 
|-
|Loss
|align=center| 5–2–1 (1)
|Jameel Massouh
|Decision (unanimous)
|Superior Challenge 5	
|
|align=center| 3
|align=center| 5:00
|Stockholm, Sweden
| 
|-
|Loss
|align=center| 5–1–1 (1)
|Fábio Mello
|Submission (armbar)
|Bellator 12
|
|align=center|3
|align=center|1:58
|Hollywood, Florida, United States
|
|-
|Win
|align=center| 5–0–1 (1)
|Tomohiko Hori
|Decision (unanimous)
|Superior Challenge 3
|
|align=center|3
|align=center|5:00
|Stockholm, Sweden
|
|-
|NC
|align=center| 4–0–1 (1)
|Emmanuel Fernandez
|NC (accidental headbutt)
|Superior Challenge 2
|
|align=center|2
|align=center|1:44
|Stockholm, Sweden
|
|-
|Win
|align=center| 4–0–1
|Frederic Fernandez
|TKO (punches)
|Superior Challenge 1
|
|align=center|1
|align=center|0:37
|Stockholm, Sweden
|
|-
|Win
|align=center| 3–0–1
|Hiroyuki Abe
|KO (punches)
|Bodog FIGHT: Vancouver
|
|align=center|1
|align=center|2:31
|Vancouver, British Columbia, Canada
|
|-
|Draw
|align=center| 2–0–1
|Rafael Dias
|Draw
|Bodog FIGHT: Costa Rica Combat
|
|align=center| 3
|align=center| 5:00
|Costa Rica
|
|-
|Win
|align=center| 2–0
|Anderson Pereira
|Decision (unanimous)
|Universal Promotions: Mix Fight
|
|align=center|3
|align=center|5:00
|Antwerp, Belgium
|
|-
|Win
|align=center| 1–0
|Wim Deputter
|Decision (unanimous)
|Dawsu Fight Event
|
|align=center|3
|align=center|5:00
|Belgium
|
|-

References

External links
 

1972 births
Living people
Swedish male boxers
Swedish male sport wrestlers
Olympic wrestlers of Sweden
Wrestlers at the 1992 Summer Olympics
Wrestlers at the 1996 Summer Olympics
Swedish male mixed martial artists
Featherweight mixed martial artists
Mixed martial artists utilizing boxing 
Mixed martial artists utilizing freestyle wrestling
Mixed martial artists utilizing Greco-Roman wrestling
Sportspeople from Gothenburg
Mixed martial arts trainers
Swedish sports coaches